Allium flavum, the small yellow onion or yellow-flowered garlic, is a species of flowering plant in the genus Allium.
A bulbous herbaceous perennial, it is native to the lands surrounding the Mediterranean, Black, and Caspian Seas, from France + Morocco to Iran + Kazakhstan.

Description
Allium flavum produces one bulb, and a scape up to 40 cm tall. The Umbel contains bright yellow, bell shaped flowers with a pleasing scent. The Latin species epithet flavum means "yellow", referring to its flower colour. It flowers between June and July and is hardy to USDA zones 4 to 8.

In cultivation in the UK, Allium flavum has gained the Royal Horticultural Society’s Award of Garden Merit.

Varieties and subspecies
Numerous names have been proposed but only the following are accepted by the World Checklist
 Allium flavum subsp. flavum - Turkey, central  + southern Europe
 Allium flavum subsp. ionochlorum Maire - Algeria, Morocco
 Allium flavum var. minus Boiss. - Turkey
 Allium flavum var. pilosum Kollmann & Koyuncu - Adana Province in Turkey
 Allium flavum subsp. tauricum (Besser ex Rchb.) K.Richt - Middle East, Greece, Romania, Ukraine, European Russia, Caucasus, Kazakhstan

References

External links
 

flavum
Onions
Flora of Europe
Flora of North Africa
Flora of temperate Asia
Plants described in 1753
Taxa named by Carl Linnaeus
Taxobox binomials not recognized by IUCN